Brachyolene picta is a species of beetle in the family Cerambycidae. It was described by Stephan von Breuning in 1938. It is known from Somalia.

References

Endemic fauna of Somalia
Tetraulaxini
Beetles described in 1938
Taxa named by Stephan von Breuning (entomologist)